

Expeditions, field work, and fossil discoveries
 Summer: William Edmund Cutler resumed collecting dinosaur fossils in Dinosaur Provincial Park. One discovery was a disarticulated ceratopsian he identified as an "Eoceratops". He spent the remainder of the year excavating the specimen although his progress was hampered by illness and bad weather.

Institutions and organizations

Natural history museums

Scientific organizations

Scientific advances

Paleoanthropology

Paleobotany

Evolutionary biology

Exopaleontology

Extinction research

Micropaleontology

Invertebrate paleozoology

Trace fossils

Vertebrate paleozoology

Data courtesy of George Olshevsky's dinosaur genera list.

Research techniques

Fossil trade

Law and politics

Regulation of fossil collection, transport, or sale

Fossil-related crime

Official symbols

Protected areas

Ethics and practice

Hoaxes

Scandals

Unethical practice

People

Births

Awards and recognition

Deaths

Historiography and anthropology of paleontology

Pseudoscience

Popular culture

Amusement parks and attractions

Art

Comics

Film

Gaming

Literature
 In the Morning of Time by Charles G. D. Roberts was published. Paleontologist William A. S. Sarjeant has described it as unusually factual for a work of fiction.

Philately

Television

See also

References

1910s in paleontology
Paleontology
Paleontology 9